John H. Watson may refer to:
 Dr. Watson (John H. Watson), a fictional character in the Sherlock Holmes stories by Sir Arthur Conan Doyle
 John H. Watson (Vermont judge), Vermont attorney and judge
 John Hampton Watson, American doctor, lawyer, and judge in Kansas

See also
 John Watson (disambiguation)